Turbonilla argentina is a species of sea snail, a marine gastropod mollusk in the family Pyramidellidae, the pyrams and their allies.

It was formerly placed in the genus  in Eulimella, but a study published in November 2011 in Zootaxa, concluded that it did not belong there.

Description
The shell grows to a length of 5.5 mm.

Distribution
This species occurs in the Atlantic Ocean off Uruguay and Argentina.

References

External links
 To Encyclopedia of Life
 To World Register of Marine Species

argentina
Gastropods described in 1938